The 2019 Maharlika Pilipinas Basketball League (MPBL) Finals (also known as the 2019 MPBL Datu Cup Finals), was the best-of-5 championship series of the 2018–19 MPBL Datu Cup and the conclusion of the season's playoffs. Under a new playoff format, the San Juan Knights, the MPBL Northern Division champion, and Davao Occidental Tigers as the MPBL Southern Division Champion, competed for the inaugural Datu Cup championship and the second overall championship contested by the league. Davao Occidental, which finished with the better regular season record, held the homecourt advantage for the series. The San Juan Knights won the championship after defeating the Tigers in five games, 3 games to 2.

Background

San Juan Knights 
The San Juan Knights entered the season as heavy favorites to win the national championship, as they are loaded with a mix of ex-pro players, collegiate players and homegrown players. They finished the regular season with a 20-5 win loss record, tying with the Manila Stars for third place as both teams had an identical record. The Knights were able to clinch the third seed as they defeated the Stars in the eliminations. In the first two rounds of the playoffs, The Knights easily dealt the Navotas Clutch and the Quezon City Capitals both in just two games each series. The Division Finals saw their sister team, Manila Stars battling them for the Northern Division title. The series went to a decider, where the team would eventually defeat the Stars in Game 3 to clinch North Division title and move to their first ever MPBL Finals appearance.

Davao Occidental Tigers 
Davao Occidental Tigers came in to the tournament as the 2018 Preseason Champions winning over the Manila Stars in the finals. The Tigers ended their regular season with 20–5 win-loss record, to become the top seed in the South Division and clinch homecourt advantage for the division playoffs. They easily defeated the Cebu City Sharks and the Bacoor City Strikers in the first round and in the division semifinals, both sweeping in two games each series. In the division finals, they faced the defending 2018 MPBL Rajah Cup Champions Batangas City Athletics but were pushed to the limits, even forcing Game 3 decider before escaping the Athletics, to claim its division title and advance to its first ever MPBL Finals appearance.

Road to the Finals

Head-to-head matchup 
Since both teams have an identical 20–5 win-loss record, the Davao Occidental Tigers will hold the homecourt advantage for the title series as they defeated the San Juan Knights in the eliminations.

Series summary

MPBL Finals Series

Game 1

Game 2

Game 3

Game 4

Game 5

Broadcast notes 
ABS-CBN Sports and ABS-CBN Regional Network Group is the official broadcaster of the Datu Cup Finals that were aired via S+A, ABS-CBN and on Fox Sports Philippines.

Fox Sports Philippines provided the English-language coverage of the title series.

Additional Game 5 crew:
Trophy presentation: Dyan Castillejo
Dugout celebration interviewer:

Prizes 
The San Juan Knights won the P10 million pesos worth of 18-karat gold trophy, similar to that NBA's Larry O'Brien Trophy, and ball rings which will await the National Champions as per league founder Sen. Manny Pacquiao and Commissioner Kenneth Duremdes.

References 

Maharlika Pilipinas Basketball League
2019 in Philippine sport